Home Township may refer to:

Home Township, Nemaha County, Kansas, Nemaha County, Kansas
Home Township, Montcalm County, Michigan
Home Township, Newaygo County, Michigan
Home Township, Brown County, Minnesota
Home Township, Turner County, South Dakota, in Turner County, South Dakota

Township name disambiguation pages